A Bigger Bang was a worldwide concert tour by the Rolling Stones which took place between August 2005 and August 2007, in support of their album A Bigger Bang. At the time, it was the highest grossing tour of all time, earning $558,255,524. It has since been surpassed by U2's 2009–11 U2 360 Tour, placing second . The tour was chronicled on the video release The Biggest Bang, compiling full performances, several recordings from shows and documentaries.

History
In 2005, the Stones announced plans for another world tour starting 21 August at a press conference and a mini concert at the Juilliard School in New York City. The A Bigger Bang Tour was expected to include dates throughout the United States and Canada before going to South America, Asia and Europe. During the Q&A, Mick Jagger told reporters that it would not necessarily be their last tour.

All rehearsals for the tour took place in Toronto, Ontario, at the midtown private school Greenwood College School; for the full stage rehearsals, a hangar at Pearson International Airport was rented.

In keeping with tradition, the Rolling Stones performed a surprise club show on 10 August 2005 at the Phoenix Concert Theatre before an audience of 1,000, each only paying $10 (the Phoenix's regular cover charge).

The tour had its official start on 21 August 2005 with two shows at historic Fenway Park in Boston. The Stones' huge stage caused extensive damage to the outfield, so that approximately 40,000 square feet (4,000 m2) of sod had to be brought in to repair it, and a subsequent baseball game held at the park three days later had to be pushed back an hour to give the grounds crew more time to complete the repairs.

At the end of 2005, it was announced by tour producer Michael Cohl that the A Bigger Bang Tour had grossed a record-shattering $162 million since opening at Fenway Park. This broke the previous North American record, held by the Stones themselves for their own 1994/1995 Voodoo Lounge Tour, which grossed approximately $120 million.
In terms of revenue, the A Bigger Bang Tour was the largest tour in North America. The second largest was the Stones' 1997/1998 Bridges to Babylon Tour.

On 1 February 2006, the Stones played their first concert at the Baltimore Arena since 1969, the second smallest venue they played for the entire tour. Their most intimate performance, save the surprise Phoenix show in Toronto, was in Radio City Music Hall on 14 March 2006, in a private concert for supporters of the Robin Hood Foundation. This benefit concert was their only performance at the venue to date. Other intimate venues the Stones played during the tour was the Beacon Theatre in New York City. On 28 August 2005, the Rolling Stones performed at Frank Clair Stadium in Ottawa, Ontario, Canada, their first performance in Ottawa since a performance at the Ottawa Auditorium 40 years earlier on 24 April 1965.

While on the American leg of the tour, on 5 February 2006 the Stones played "Start Me Up", "Rough Justice" and "(I Can't Get No) Satisfaction" at the halftime show of Super Bowl XL in Detroit. Before performing "Satisfaction", Jagger made an uncharacteristic comment on their longevity: "This one we could've done for Super Bowl I." Jagger was asked to leave out two sexually suggestive lyrics. The audio on his microphone was lowered twice for the two requested omissions, but Jagger still sang those lyrics.

The outstanding scale of the tour was realised on 18 February 2006 when the Stones played a one-night concert on Copacabana Beach in Rio de Janeiro, Brazil. The free concert was broadcast on television and broke several records as the largest rock concert of all time. There were a reported two million people present on the beach and crowding subsequent streets. A special bridge was constructed for the band to cross from the stage to the hotel safely. Three days after the monstrous event, U2 played in São Paulo, and clearly affected by the huge night, ended their concert with the words: "I can't get no satisfaction!". While the Guinness Book of World Records states the largest free concert ever was given in the same spot in 1994 by Rod Stewart, to 3.5 million people, that figure includes everyone who was on Copacabana Beach for fireworks and New Year's Eve celebrations, not just for that concert. This show was recorded for exhibition on digital movie screens across the United States via Regal Cinemas and heard live on XM Radio. Additionally, the show was shown live on AOL Music in partnership with Network Live.

The Stones arrived on 8 April in the People's Republic of China for their first-ever performance in the world's most populous country (performances planned in 2003 for the Licks Tour were canceled due to the SARS epidemic). The Chinese authorities requested that the group not perform "Brown Sugar", "Honky Tonk Women", "Beast of Burden", and "Let's Spend the Night Together", as they were considered to be "too suggestive."

The Biggest Bang, a four-disc concert DVD collection with several shows from the band's 2005–2006 legs of this tour, was released in June 2007.

"A Bigger Bang: Live on Copacabana Beach", a double CD / triple LP / Blu-ray / double DVD live album, was released on July 9, 2021.

After their 18 April 2006 performance in Wellington, New Zealand, the Rolling Stones took a one-month break before embarking on the European leg of their A Bigger Bang Tour. Mick Jagger remained in New Zealand to film a cameo in the sitcom The Knights of Prosperity, while Keith Richards and Ronnie Wood went to Fiji for two weeks with their wives.

During the vacation, Richards fell from a tree. After suffering a concussion, he was rushed back to Ascot Private Hospital in Auckland, New Zealand, for further observation. Although reports claimed he had been released two days later, it was soon confirmed by the hospital he underwent brain surgery on 5 May to relieve a blood clot that had gathered behind his skull. The BBC reported that upon discharge, Richards profusely thanked the hospital staff for his care.

On 15 May, Britain's The Independent newspaper said that the injury meant up to six shows could be pulled from the start of the band's European tour at an estimated cost of £1 million a show. The A Bigger Bang Tour restarted in Milan, Italy on 11 July 2006 at Stadio Giuseppe Meazza, with Jagger singing an entire Italian translation of "As Tears Go By" and Richards having made a full recovery; four of the first fifteen dates were rescheduled for later in the summer, with the rest of the dates taking place in the summer of 2007. As well as the first fifteen dates, two more dates were postponed due to Jagger contracting laryngitis.

The only previous show cancelled was one in Dublin, due to complications with the promoter. Due to delays with construction, the two shows set to be at Wembley Stadium were moved to Twickenham Stadium, London.  To promote this European leg of the A Bigger Bang Tour, there were plans to release the new track "Biggest Mistake" from the A Bigger Bang album.

In mid-August 2007, several media sources reported that the band would quit touring at the end of their tour, and the last concert on the tour, in London on 26 August, would be their last gig ever. Less than a week later, in an interview with The Sun newspaper, Wood said the band had no plans to quit. and Jagger also stated "I'm sure the Rolling Stones will do more things and more records and more tours."

The tour concluded with a record total gross of $558,255,524. This surpassed the previous record of $377 million earned by U2 for their successful Vertigo Tour. The Stones also hold the record for third and fourth highest grossing tours with the Voodoo Lounge Tour and Bridges to Babylon Tour.

The official logo for the tour was the "Chippy Tongue"—an exploding re-design of the tongue and lips logo.

The show
There were five different ticket options at each concert in the USA: Gold Seating $100, Diamond Seating $350, Premium Seating $175, General Admission $100 and Side Seating $50. In the United Kingdom, the price levels were £40, £60, £90, £150 and £340. Tickets had been seen on eBay for up to $4000. Hundreds of tickets remained unsold at some of the band's British shows, such as the show at Hampden Park, Glasgow, though the show at the Millennium Stadium in Cardiff was a sell out. The first concert at Fenway Park also saw California Governor Arnold Schwarzenegger charge 36 Republican donors US$100,000 each to view the show with him in his VIP box. Jagger quipped about Schwarzenegger, "Apparently he's been fundraising outside, selling bootleg T-shirts and scalping tickets", to the crowd, with Richards adding, "Hey, Arnold, don't forget our cut on the T-shirts."

The A Bigger Bang Tour stage was designed by Mark Fisher. Production design was by Fisher, Charlie Watts, Mick Jagger and Patrick Woodroffe.  The show included state-of-the-art electronics that presented visual screen shots of the Stones Tongue and live footage. The stage was 25 m (84 ft) tall. The multi-level construction included balconies behind the stage with accommodation for 400 audience.  As on the Bridges to Babylon and Licks tours, the band played part of the set on a 'B' stage in the center of the field.  A section of the stage detached itself and rolled the entire band along a catwalk, creating an "island" B stage in the middle of the stadium. Unusual stage designs in and of themselves have been a feature since Rolling Stones Tour of the Americas '75.

The introduction featured fireworks and computer-generated graphics representing the literal Big Bang. The four band members' faces hazily appear, and further graphics depicting fast travel through a city's streets before Keith Richards appeared on the screen to the sound of the band's opening song (mainly "Start Me Up" or "Jumpin' Jack Flash" although a handful of other numbers opened shows on the tour).

During the concerts, one large central screen played live footage of the various band members, predominantly Jagger. Either side of the main screen, there were two sets of lighting effect panels that combine with the main screen to produce visual effects at various points in the show.

At stadium gigs, during "Sympathy for the Devil", huge flames were sent into the air above the stage. During the 1970s, this song only made sporadic live appearances, though is captured on 1977's Love You Live. However, since 1989's Steel Wheels Tour, "Sympathy for the Devil" has become a setlist mainstay and a vehicle for the show's most elaborate effects.

On Saturday 11 November 2006, Mick Jagger's father, Joe Jagger, died of pneumonia at age ninety-three in Kingston upon Thames near London. Jagger flew to Britain the day before to see his father one last time before returning to Las Vegas the same day, where he was to perform on Saturday night. The show went ahead as scheduled.

Personnel
Rolling Stones
Mick Jagger – lead vocals, guitars, harmonica, keyboards
Keith Richards – rhythm guitars, backing vocals
Ronnie Wood – lead guitar
Charlie Watts – drums

Additional musicians
Darryl Jones – bass
Chuck Leavell – keyboards, backing vocals
Bernard Fowler – backing vocals
Lisa Fischer – backing vocals, percussion
Blondie Chaplin – backing vocals, acoustic guitar
Bobby Keys – saxophone
Tim Ries – saxophone, keyboards
Michael Davis – trombone
Kent Smith – trumpet

Set lists
The set list played at the concerts changed at every destination and included new and old songs, but mostly centred around the same numbers. Altogether 80 different songs were played. At almost every destination, the opening song switched between "Jumpin' Jack Flash", "Start Me Up", "It's Only Rock 'n' Roll", and "Paint It Black"; the closing numbers were either "(I Can't Get No) Satisfaction" or "Brown Sugar." A selection of new material was frequent as well as two songs sung by guitarist Keith Richards.

New tracks included: "Rough Justice", "Infamy", "This Place Is Empty", "It Won't Take Long", "Rain Fall Down", "Streets of Love", "Back of My Hand" and "Oh No, Not You Again."

The set list for the final show in The O2 in London, England, on 26 August – the last concert of the tour – was the following:

"Start Me Up"
"You Got Me Rocking"
"Rough Justice"
"Ain't Too Proud To Beg"
"She Was Hot"
"You Can't Always Get What You Want"
"Can't You Hear Me Knocking"
"I'll Go Crazy"
"Tumbling Dice"
"You Got the Silver"
"Wanna Hold You"
"Miss You"
"It's Only Rock 'n Roll (But I Like It)"
"(I Can't Get No) Satisfaction"
"Honky Tonk Women"
"Sympathy for the Devil"
"Paint It Black"
"Jumpin' Jack Flash"
"Brown Sugar"

According to Setlist.fm, these were the most frequently performed songs on the tour:

Jumpin' Jack Flash: 147 times
Tumbling Dice: 147 times
Start Me Up: 147 times
(I Can't Get No) Satisfaction: 147 times
Sympathy for the Devil: 146 times
Brown Sugar: 146 times
Honky Tonk Women: 144 times
Rough Justice: 127 times
It's Only Rock and Roll (But I Like It): 125 times
Miss You: 121 times

Support acts
Artists playing as an introduction to the Stones at various destinations included Toots & the Maytals, Lifehouse, The Black Eyed Peas, Alice Cooper, Maroon 5, Kanye West, Beck, Pearl Jam, The Smashing Pumpkins, Alanis Morissette, Christina Aguilera, Mötley Crüe, Metallica, Brooks & Dunn, Bonnie Raitt, Trey Anastasio, Dave Matthews Band, Living Colour, The Living End, Joss Stone, Nickelback, Buddy Guy, The Charlatans, Regina, Feeder, the John Mayer Trio, Wilco, Richie Kotzen and Our Lady Peace.

Dominican artist Juan Luis Guerra opened the San Juan, Puerto Rico, show, making him the only Merengue artist that has ever opened for the Stones. This opening act "garnered the best reception ever seen at a Stones show", as reported by It's Only Rock and Roll, the Rolling Stones Fan Club of Europe.

For the Halifax, Nova Scotia, show acts included Halifax natives Sloan, well known rap artist Kanye West and Alice Cooper. Black Rebel Motorcycle Club opened the shows in Wichita and Missoula. Three Days Grace opened both concerts in Regina. Blue October opened for them in Nampa, Idaho.

The two shows in San Francisco were supported by Metallica, who said they were "honoured" to break a seventeen-year span of not performing an opening show, in order to open for the Stones. The Stones acknowledged this gesture by giving them 75 minutes per show, instead of the usual 45 to 60 minutes. They were also Metallica's only dates that year as they had planned to take 2005 off from touring.

Guns N' Roses were scheduled to open for the Stones for two dates in Germany, whilst on one of their Chinese Democracy Tour pre-legs. However, due to Keith Richards' fall from a tree, the shows were cancelled.

Van Morrison was the supporting act in Nijmegen, Netherlands, as well as in Oakland, California. Due to heavy rain his amps, etc. were getting wet, so he was forced to stop after two songs.

Tour dates

Festivals and other miscellaneous performances
This concert was a part of "Super Bowl XL"
This concert was a part of "Isle of Wight Festival"

Box office score data

Gallery

See also
 Rolling Stones concerts
 List of highest grossing concert tours
 List of highest-attended concerts
 The Rolling Stones first concert in China

References

External links

The Rolling Stones concert tours
2005 concert tours
2006 concert tours
2007 concert tours
Concert tours of North America
Concert tours of the United States
Concert tours of Canada
Concert tours of Mexico
Concert tours of Europe
Concert tours of the United Kingdom
Concert tours of France
Concert tours of Germany
Concert tours of Ireland
Concert tours of Oceania
Concert tours of Australia
Concert tours of New Zealand
Concert tours of South America
Concert tours of Asia
Concert tours of Japan